The  is a suspension bridge crossing northern Tokyo Bay between Shibaura Pier and the Odaiba waterfront development in Minato, Tokyo, Japan.

It is named Tōkyō Kō Renrakukyō (東京港連絡橋) as the official name in Japanese.

It was built by Kawasaki Heavy Industries, with construction starting in 1987 and completed in 1993. Officially called the "Shuto Expressway No. 11 Daiba Route - Port of Tokyo Connector Bridge," the name "Rainbow Bridge" was decided by the public.

The towers supporting the bridge are white in color, designed to harmonize with the skyline of central Tokyo seen from Odaiba. There are lamps placed on the wires supporting the bridge, which are illuminated into three different colors, red, white and green every night using solar energy obtained during the day.

The bridge can be accessed by foot from Tamachi Station (JR East) or Shibaura-futō Station (Yurikamome) on the mainland side.

Usage
The Rainbow Bridge carries three transportation lines on two decks. The upper deck carries the Shuto Expressway's Daiba Route, while the lower deck carries the Yurikamome rapid transit system in the centre, walkways on the outer side, and Tokyo Prefectural Route 482 in-between. Light motorcycles under 50cc are not permitted on either deck or the walkway of the bridge. Motorcycle pillion passengers are also banned.

Walkway
The bridge has two separate walkways on the north and south sides of the lower deck; the north side offers views of the inner Tokyo harbour and Tokyo Tower, while the south side offers views of Tokyo Bay and occasionally Mount Fuji. The walkways may only be used during certain hours (9 am to 9 pm in the summer; 10 am to 6 pm in the winter, access to the walkways close 30 minutes before closing time.) Bicycles are permitted on the condition that they are pushed (as opposed to riding them).

Panorama

See also 

 Akashi Kaikyo Bridge
 Tokyo Bay Aqua-Line
 Yokohama Bay Bridge
 List of bridges in Japan
 List of longest suspension bridge spans

References

External links

 Rainbow Bridge (Metropolitan Expressway Co., Ltd.) 
 

Odaiba
Bridges completed in 1993
Bridges in Tokyo
Suspension bridges in Japan
Railway bridges in Japan
Buildings and structures in Minato, Tokyo
Former toll bridges in Japan
1993 establishments in Japan
Road-rail bridges in Japan
Double-decker bridges